Jaipur District is a district of the state of Rajasthan in Northern India. The city of Jaipur, which is Rajasthan's capital and largest city, is the district headquarters. It is the tenth most populous district in India (out of 640).

Divisions

Being the state capital, Jaipur has a Legislative Assembly. The 13 Sub-divisions in district are: 
 Jaipur
 Amber
 Bassi
 Chaksu
 Chomu
 Mauzmabad
 Jamwa Ramgarh
 Phagi
 Phulera
 Kotputli
 Sanganer
 Shahpura
 Viratnagar

Panchayat Samitis are: 
 Amber
 Bassi 
 Chaksu 
 Govindgarh 
 Dudu 
 Jamwa Ramgarh 
 Phagi 
 Sambhar 
 Jhotwara 
 Kotputli 
 Shahpura
 Sanganer
 Viratnagar

Tehsils are: 
3 new tehsils have recently been added, earlier there were 13 tehsils and now 16.
 Amber
 Bassi 
 Chaksu 
 Chomu 
 Dudu 
 Jamwa Ramgarh 
 Phagi 
 Sambhar 
 Jaipur
 Kotputli 
 Shahpura 
 Sanganer 
 Viratnagar
 Kot Khawada
 Kishangarh-Renwal
Mauzamabad
Paota

Demographics

According to the 2011 census Jaipur district has a population of 6,626,178, roughly equal to the nation of Libya or the US state of Washington. This gives it a ranking of 10th in India (out of a total of 640). Its population growth rate over the decade 2001-2011 was 26.91%. Jaipur has a sex ratio of 909 females for every 1000 males, and a literacy rate of 76.44%. 52.40% of the population lives in urban areas. Scheduled Castes and Scheduled Tribes make up 15.14% and 7.97% of the population respectively.

Languages 

At the time of the 2011 Census of India, 45.85% of the population in the district spoke Hindi, 34.44% Rajasthani, 11.31% Dhundari, 2.74% Urdu, 2.52% Marwari, 1.21% Sindhi, 0.42% Punjabi and 0.41% Bengali as their first language.

Culture

Notable personalities
 HH Galtapeethadheeshwar Swami Avadheshacharya Ji Maharaj - Mahant, Shri Galta Peeth.
 Hemant Shesh (1952- ) Writer and civil servant. Born in Jaipur.

Climate

References

https://jaipur.rajasthan.gov.in/content/raj/jaipur/en/about-jaipur/blocks-tehsils-panchayats.html#

External links

 Jaipur District

 
Districts of Rajasthan
Districts in Jaipur division